The Eastern Daly languages are an extinct family of Australian aboriginal languages that are fairly closely related, at 50% cognate.  They were:

Matngele
Kamu

These languages had elements of verbal structure that suggest they may be related to the Macro-Gunwinyguan languages. All are now extinct.

Vocabulary
The following basic vocabulary items are from Tryon (1968).

{| class="wikitable sortable"
! no. !! gloss !! Kamor !! Matngala
|-
| 1 || head || puǰæ || puǰa
|-
| 2 || hair || puǰæmaR || pučæmænæŋ
|-
| 3 || eyes || miyam || dun
|-
| 4 || nose || činin || činin
|-
| 5 || ear || piyawuR || peyawuR
|-
| 6 || tooth || ŋat || ŋat
|-
| 7 || tongue || ŋaltïretïre || ŋænæR
|-
| 8 || shoulder || tæwæR || tæwæR
|-
| 9 || elbow || dændar || dandar
|-
| 10 || hand || mæmæk || mæmæk
|-
| 11 || breasts || kuyuŋ || mœRmœR
|-
| 12 || back || dætœm || dætœm
|-
| 13 || belly || mæn || pak
|-
| 14 || navel || čœdur || čœdœR
|-
| 15 || heart || mændulma || mændulma
|-
| 16 || urine || wure || wœre
|-
| 17 || excrete || kœn || kœn
|-
| 18 || thigh || čære || čære
|-
| 19 || leg || kærær || kaR
|-
| 20 || knee || pœŋgaR || pœŋgar
|-
| 21 || foot || mær || mær
|-
| 22 || skin || baR || karala
|-
| 23 || fat || mœdl || mœdl
|-
| 24 || blood || čœrŋuɲ || čœruŋœɲ
|-
| 25 || bone || pæč || pæč
|-
| 26 || man || čiǰe || čije
|-
| 27 || woman || pamgun || kuwarak
|-
| 28 || father || baŋɔ || baŋgač
|-
| 29 || mother || kilaɲŋɔ || kidlaŋ
|-
| 30 || grandmother || kalaɲŋɔ || kawoy
|-
| 31 || policeman || čayač || čaǰiɲ
|-
| 32 || spear || kanbe || kanbe
|-
| 33 || woomera || lagač || lagaɲ
|-
| 34 || boomerang || čïmbičïmbič || čïmbičïmbič
|-
| 35 || nullanulla || magulbɔ || yimnalanala
|-
| 36 || hair-belt || maR || muŋuR
|-
| 37 || canoe || wænæ || wænæ
|-
| 38 || axe || mæŋ || mæŋ
|-
| 39 || dilly bag || kalan || kaRaR
|-
| 40 || fire || yim || yim
|-
| 41 || smoke || wæn || wuŋgɔR
|-
| 42 || water || wuk || wuk
|-
| 43 || cloud || wœŋ || pær
|-
| 44 || rainbow || pululɔy || pulɔypulɔy
|-
| 45 || barramundi || kœyl || kœly
|-
| 46 || sea || wuk kučuwoy || kærætïl
|-
| 47 || river || wukpædæR || pædæR
|-
| 48 || stone || pawar || pawaR
|-
| 49 || ground || yurɔ || yurɔ
|-
| 50 || track || čal || mær
|-
| 51 || dust || puruŋ || puruŋ
|-
| 52 || sun || mœRœR || mœrœr
|-
| 53 || moon || nœdœn || nudun
|-
| 54 || star || naŋɔ || milan
|-
| 55 || night || ŋoykdiɲ || ŋœyč
|-
| 56 || tomorrow || pukunuŋ || neganuŋ
|-
| 57 || today || neyœnuŋ || kamɔ
|-
| 58 || big || æluŋɔ || kunuwaraŋ
|-
| 59 || possum || bɔ || bɔ
|-
| 60 || dog || čamar || čamaR
|-
| 61 || tail || čirin || čiriɲ
|-
| 62 || meat || piɲæk || piɲa
|-
| 63 || snake || piɲam || ŋuɲbœr
|-
| 64 || red kangaroo || čayïR || čayɛR
|-
| 65 || porcupine || mïdlk || mænɛŋɛč
|-
| 66 || emu || nœwœt || nœwœt
|-
| 67 || crow || waŋgaR || waŋgaR
|-
| 68 || goanna || araɲ || aRaɲ
|-
| 69 || blue tongue lizard || pïRir || pïRïR
|-
| 70 || mosquito || wuræŋ || wœraŋ
|-
| 71 || sugar-bag || wamæR || wæmæR
|-
| 72 || camp || dak || dak
|-
| 73 || black || wakpara || wakwaRa
|-
| 74 || white || puŋma || tamaRma
|-
| 75 || red || pirpma || piRpma
|-
| 76 || one || næmbayɔ || næmbeyɔ
|-
| 77 || two || palpmurɔ || kurinǰeyɔ
|-
| 78 || when? || anaɲmiye || aneɲïmbediɲ
|-
| 79 || what? || anǰanuŋ || anǰa
|-
| 80 || who? || nuwun || nuŋuɲ
|-
| 81 || I || ŋurɔnuŋ || ŋurɔ
|-
| 82 || you || nuŋgɔrnuŋ || waŋare
|-
| 83 || he || kuna || kuna
|-
| 84 || grass || wæn || wæn
|-
| 85 || vegetable food || mæye || miye
|-
| 86 || tree || yim || yim
|-
| 87 || leaf || wurœr || dæmbæl
|-
| 88 || pandanus || čaŋača || čaŋača
|-
| 89 || ironwood || pawič || pawit
|-
| 90 || ripe || damgane || pirpma
|-
| 91 || good || kunburiɲ || kunburič
|-
| 92 || bad || kuwaruk || kuwarɔ
|-
| 93 || blind || wuɲ || wuɲ
|-
| 94 || deaf || ɲaba || ɲaba
|-
| 95 || saliva || tak || tak
|}

See also 
Daly languages

References 

 
Daly languages
Language families